The Big Brother television franchise has been broadcast under two different titles in Quebec, Canada:

Loft Story the first incarnation of the franchise,
Big Brother the second incarnation of the franchise.

Big Brother Canada may also refer to:
Big Brother Canada the first Canadian English language incarnation of the franchise, third overall.

See also
Big Brother (disambiguation)

Canada